The Turkey River is a  stream located in southern New Hampshire in the United States. It is a tributary of the Merrimack River, which flows to the Gulf of Maine.

The source of the Turkey River is the outlet of Little Turkey Pond in Concord, New Hampshire. The river travels southeast through the campus of St. Paul's School, winding through the outskirts of Concord, and entering Bow before joining the Merrimack near the junction of Interstate 93 and Interstate 89. In May 2006 record amounts of rainfall over two days caused the Turkey River to flood the campus of St. Paul's School, forcing the school year to be ended prematurely.

See also

List of rivers of New Hampshire

References

Tributaries of the Merrimack River
Rivers of New Hampshire
Concord, New Hampshire
Rivers of Merrimack County, New Hampshire